Tobias Damsgaard (born 3 August 1998) is a Danish footballer who plays for Thisted FC.

Career

Club career
Born in Aarhus, Damsgaard began playing youth football for Aarhus Fremad before playing a year for SønderjyskE  while attending efterskole. At under-17 level, he joined the Randers FC youth sector.

On transfer deadline day, 31 January 2020, Damsgaard was loaned out to Vendsyssel FF for the rest of the season. Vendsyssel FF confirmed on 18 May 2020, that they had bought Damsgaard free of his contract and he would join the club permanently on 1 July 2020. On 22 July 2020 Vendsyssel announced, that Damsgaard had signed permanently for the club on a three-year deal. On 19 August 2022 Vendsyssel confirmed, that Damsgaard's contract had been terminated, as he had signed with German Regionalliga side 1. FC Phönix Lübeck.

At the end of December 2022, Damsgaard returned to Denmark, signing with 2nd Division side Thisted FC.

References

1998 births
Living people
Danish men's footballers
Danish expatriate men's footballers
Footballers from Aarhus
Association football defenders
Danish Superliga players
Danish 1st Division players
Aarhus Fremad players
SønderjyskE Fodbold players
Randers FC players
Vendsyssel FF players
1. FC Phönix Lübeck players
Thisted FC players
Danish expatriate sportspeople in Germany
Expatriate footballers in Germany